The Burnett was an electoral district of the Legislative Assembly in the Australian state of New South Wales created for the July 1859 election and named after the Burnett River. It was abolished in December 1859 as a result of the separation of Queensland.

Members for Burnett

Election results

1859

References

Former electoral districts of New South Wales
Electoral districts of New South Wales in the area of Queensland
History of Queensland
1859 establishments in Australia
Constituencies established in 1859
1859 disestablishments in Australia
Constituencies disestablished in 1859